St. Catharine High School is an American all-girls', private, Roman Catholic high school located in the Pelham Gardens neighborhood of the Bronx, New York.  

It is located within the Roman Catholic Archdiocese of New York.

History

The Sisters of Mercy, founded by Mother Catherine McAuley in Dublin, Ireland, opened an academy in the Washington Heights section of Manhattan in New York City in September 1889. 

The classes included grades 1 through 12. 

At that time, the first academy resembled the large estates which surrounded it. Toward the end of the 19th century, as registration increased, the sisters erected a new building across the street at 539 West 152nd Street. 

In 1900, the University of the State of New York granted a Regents charter to the school.

The rapid growth of the area and the great increase in enrollment showed the inadequacy of the accommodations. The elementary grades in the academy were discontinued and these classrooms were used for high school students.

Facilities were not sufficient even with this change, so it was necessary to build a much larger school. In the fall of 1953 the old building was sold and the academy moved to its present location at 2250 Williamsbridge Road. The school continues to undergo a series of renovations and improvements.

As of 2019, the school's enrollment was approximately 500 girls.

Sponsorship and fees

The school is sponsored by the Sisters of Mercy of the Regional Community of New York.

Annual tuition is approximately $11,000. There is also a general fee of $800 for Grade 9 students and $650 for Grades 10–12, which covers a school-leased iPad, a graphic calculator (grade 9), and other necessities.

Accreditation
The school is chartered by the Board of Regents of the University of the State of New York and is accredited by the Middle States Association of Colleges and Schools, the Mercy Secondary Education Association and the National Catholic Educational  Association.

Programs for each student are planned to meet the requirements of the New York State Education Department.

Sports
The school offers  sports, including junior varsity and varsity basketball; 
junior varsity and varsity cheerleading;
varsity soccer; varsity softball; and 
junior varsity and varsity volleyball.
 
The school colors are blue and gold.

Notable alumnae

 June Allyson (1917–2006) – actress
 Margaret Bourke-White (1904–1971) – photographer 
 Ann Dvorak (1911-1979) – actress
 Grace Paley (1922–2007) – award-winning short-story writer
 Amanda Serrano (born 1988) – International Boxing Federation female world super featherweight champion boxer
 Marjorie Velázquez (born 1981) – New York City councilwoman

References

External links
 School website

Roman Catholic high schools in the Bronx
Educational institutions established in 1889
Girls' schools in New York City
Sisters of Mercy schools
1889 establishments in New York (state)